Abraham Lincoln High School (also known as Lincoln High Educational Complex, Lincoln High School, or simply Lincoln), is an urban public high school in San Diego, California, United States. It is part of the San Diego Unified School District. It serves approximately 2100-2700 students in grades 9–12 in the K-12 education system. It is located in the Lincoln Park neighborhood of Southeast San Diego, part of the Encanto neighborhoods.  It was named after President Abraham Lincoln.

Opened in 1949 and originally serving middle school students, Lincoln was converted into a high school in 1955. The original buildings were demolished and rebuilt during 2003–2007.

The school has produced several nationally recognized popular sports figures.

Lincoln High School is currently divided into four small academies. The centers' themes were the result of a 2005 parent survey.

Lincoln Center for Social Justice
Lincoln Center for the Arts
Lincoln Center for Science and Engineering
Lincoln Center for Public Safety

In particular, the Center for Social Justice  is educating San Diego's increasing activist culture. On Tuesday, February 10, 2009 a coalition of Lincoln High School along with Mission Bay High School, and several other schools including UC San Diego and San Diego State University sent hundreds of students, parents and teachers into the streets in support of banning weapons training in San Diego schools. The movement is reminiscent of the 1969/1970 Lincoln Walkouts which lasted for 10 days and resulted in the district's first Black principal.

Construction of facilities in the 2000s
Expansion of the school was done on existing facilities until 2003.  On September 24, 2003, Lincoln's cafeteria was the first building to be demolished.  The entire campus (with the exception of the gym) and a few homes nearby were eventually razed to make way for construction of the new campus.  This was a result of an elected ballot proposition approved by its citizens. During construction many students were displaced and relocated to other high schools in the District.  The campus expanded with additional acquisition of property through eminent domain.

Before demolition, the campus had been infamous for its gang activity, particularly when graduating senior Willie James Jones Jr. was gunned down in 1994, just days before he was to matriculate to the prestigious Cornell University, hitting headlines and sparking outrage all over the San Diego media.  The school also had been criticized for being behind academically, and there remained some skepticism in the community about Lincoln's reopening over those criticisms.  Soon after Jones's death, Pastor Roy Dixon was told by the principal that "kids entered Lincoln with extremely low reading levels and could not perform academically."

Lincoln High School was reopened on September 4, 2007.  The new  campus was designed by architect and Lincoln alum, Joseph Martinez (class of 1966), and rebuilt by many Lincoln alumni who took part in construction of the school.  At a cost of $129 million, Lincoln is currently the most expensive campus in the San Diego Unified School District.

In its newly rebuilt form, Lincoln now features major improvements such as an increased student enrollment capacity of 2,700 (from an average of 800 students during Lincoln's last few years before demolition), a 790-seat performing arts center, a football and track stadium that can seat 3,700, and other facilities for press and concessions.  The improvements addressed concerns over Lincoln's previously dilapidated and outdated facilities, proper allocation of rooms per grade enrollment, and the increasing high school enrollment pressures of the neighborhood, in addition to public input and suggestions given by members of the Lincoln community.  The site also features modern, state-of-the-art building design and facilities specialized to the curriculum.

Academic program
The Lincoln-Gompers Redevelopment Committee noted the paramount importance of holding Lincoln's students, often from groups historically under-served by the public education system, to high expectations within a rigorous, standards-based curriculum framework.

Upon Lincoln's re-opening, all students were required to fulfill the "A-G" subject area requirements for admission to the University of California, two years before San Diego Unified codified an "A-G for all" policy under then-superintendent, Terry Grier. Due in part to the uneven diaspora of its middle school students to charters and bussing to schools north of the I-8, Lincoln was privately criticized within the district for being "too ambitious" in its academic aspirations in 2007, because data indicated many incoming first-year students to Lincoln were often under-prepared in comparison to their grade-level peers in key academic disciplines such as English and math. The rationale was that the "A-G" requirement (the mandatory number and scope of college-prep classes), thrust upon students unused to such daunting expectations, would lead to grade inflation or lowered standards of instruction in college-prep classes in order to avoid massive amounts of Ds and Fs. As such, early on Lincoln High earned a reputation among parents and students for the difficulty of its core content area classes, particularly among students used to straight-As in middle school. The high expectations are most pronounced in Lincoln's Advanced Placement program, as well as in its AP-preparatory 9th and 10th grade math, science, and English courses; there are a correspondingly high number of Ds and Fs, mostly among first-semester 9th grade and 10th grade transfer students unused to such demands. Incoming Lincoln students can expect homework 3-5 nights a week in each of these core classes and must have an attendance rate of 95% in order to be successful. Lincoln partly addresses parents' and students' concerns over student sustainability in the staff recruiting parameters, which emphasize a commitment to supporting students to meet high but attainable academic goals.

 97% of the teachers at Lincoln are rated "highly qualified" under NCLB for their licensed subject area.
 Over 80% have either a master's, PhD or EdD.
 The average classroom experience of a Lincoln teacher is 10.1 years.

In addition, a systemic structure was to create a Response to Intervention (RTI) model of instructional support, with counselor positions dedicated to identifying and supporting at-risk students, primarily 9th and 10th graders. In developing curriculum, the teaching staff put special attention to data-driven instruction and culturally responsive content, with a heavy emphasis on teacher professional development. Each content area teacher attends monthly PLC (Professional Learning Community) meetings, a Center-specific meeting, and there is a minimum day each month meant to examine diagnostic and formative assessment data in course-alike groups in order to guide, target, and enhance instructional practices.

Lincoln's fledgling academic program grew from five AP (Advanced Placement) class offerings in 2007 to 18 offerings in 2010, including AP Environmental Science, AP Language and AP Literature, AP Calculus and AP Music.

Lincoln offers a broad range of support and academic enrichment for students:
 A community partnership with the Old Globe, San Diego's prestigious regional theater, which has performed several full-scale productions at the Lincoln Performing Arts Center, including Welcome to Arroyo's, and Mo'olelo Performing Arts company, a nationally recognized theatre company which "uncover[s] and research[es] stories within different communities and bring them to life on stage, using all the artistic and technical elements of the performing arts."
 Lincoln High partners (along with charter Gompers Preparatory Academy and The Preuss School) with the University of California, San Diego, a world-renowned public research university. The partnership school concept is specifically designed to connect UCSD students and resources with first-generation collegiate applicants, at-risk, and minority students in Southeast San Diego.
 Resource teachers are tasked in support of teachers and students in each of the following content areas: English language arts, math/technology, science, and history, in addition to an English-Language Learner Resource Teacher.
 Gear-Up, a "discretionary grant program [designed] to increase the number of low-income students who are prepared to enter and succeed in postsecondary education."
AVID (Advancement Via Individual Determination) program
JROTC (Junior Reserve Officer Training Corps)
Campus-wide implementation of SpringBoard, the CollegeBoard's official Pre-AP English Language Arts curriculum
Heterogenous classes (i.e. no honors or remedial sections) except for ESL or AP classes. The rationale behind inclusive, mixed-ability classrooms was that minority students were historically often "tracked" into less-demanding classes when their school perceived that they lacked academic or linguistic preparation, further exacerbating the "achievement gap" — aka the learning "opportunity gap" — between Black and Latino, and White and Asian students. To combat this systemic inequity, Lincoln's instructional philosophy is based, in part, on "differentiation," the idea that all students benefit within a classroom where there are a range of proficiencies represented, as long as a skilled teacher modifies instruction based on content, process, or product in response to the students' learning readiness, interest, and learning profile.
 A New Arrival Center in the 600 building, for students new to the country (i.e. < 12 months). Lincoln is one of only three schools in SDUSD to host a New Arrival Center. Many of these students, such as refugees from Somalia and Southwest Asia, have never experienced education a formal school setting, and benefit from mutual acculturation with other immigrant students, as well as from learning English together. Student spend four periods a day with a specially trained teacher, learning basic skills and knowledge necessary for success in American society, and can take P.E. and one elective course within a mainstream classroom. Students are exited into mainstream classroom as soon as they pass the CELDT (California English Language Development Test) and when they are determined to be sufficiently acclimated to the school culture in order to be successful in mainstream classes.
National Board Certified teachers in Physical Education (1), Generalist (New Arrival Center) (1), and English Language Arts (1).
 A robust arts small school program, including theatre, dance, choral music, instrumental music, band, and multimedia classes. 9th grade students entering Center for the Arts enroll in an Intro to Arts "wheel" course unique to San Diego Unified, where students rotate within six-week preparatory courses in Choral Music, Visual Media, and Theatre/Drama for one 18-week semester. 9th grade arts students then select an arts "focus" and immediately enroll in intermediate and, after their first year, advanced courses. Introduction to arts courses are meant to pique students' interest, but to also introduce the rigor of a specific artistic discipline; for example, 9th grade Intro to Drama students are expected to develop, write, rehearse and deliver a live performance of at least two original monologues within a ten-day  period.
 Voices of Lincoln, the school's fully online newspaper

Demographics
Lincoln High School is located in Lincoln Park, a historically working-class, African-American neighborhood in Southeast San Diego. Beginning in the late 1990s and accelerating in the early 2000s up until its closure in 2002, Lincoln High's demographics began to shift as Latino, Vietnamese, Samoan, Filipino, Laotian and other ethnic groups moved in, attracted by residential and business redevelopment, competitive home and rental pricing, close proximity to transportation hubs such as the Market Street Trolley Station, and quick access to the I-805 and CA-94. When Lincoln reopened in 2007, for the first time Latino students were the majority, reflecting the change in the demographics of the neighborhood but also soon coinciding with the severe economic downturn of 2008, which contributed significantly to student mobility. The student population has since stabilized at approximately 2100 students. As of the 2009 school year, the student body was composed of approximately 35% African-American, 55% Hispanic or Latino, and 10% other groups. Despite shifts in racial, residential, and income demographics since its reopening, over 85% of Lincoln High's students still qualify for free- and reduced-lunch programs.

Academic performance
Since 2007, Lincoln students have achieved double-digit gains on state test scores every year, with the largest increase coming in the 2008–09 school year. Starting with a baseline score of 540 in 2007–8 school year (the first year of testing), Lincoln students were expected by the State of California to gain only 13 points on the California Standards Test (CST) in the 2008–09 school year; instead students gained 47 points, to push the API (Academic Performance Index) growth score to 587. Despite these gains, in 2010 Lincoln was unable to avoid falling into "Program Improvement" under the NCLB (No Child Left Behind) federal legislation guidelines because it failed to meet mandated proficiency targets with student subgroups two years in a row, notably English Language Learners (ELLs). According to NCLB, 100% percent of students were predicted to be proficient in English and math by 2014.  As of the end of 2011, Lincoln's API has grown to a current score of 617, a growth of 77 points in 4 years.

Notable sports achievements

2009-10 basketball season
This marked the third season on the Lincoln Hornets basketball program. Coming off of a 20–11 record with a loss in the semi-finals to Oceanside High School, expectations were high for the Hornet program. In 2009–2010, the Hornets, led by Head Coach Jason Bryant and assistants Anthony Tucker, Mark McCann, Rhett Butler, Glen Worley, Jeff Harper, Victor Dean Sr. and Earl Woolridge, went on to a 29–2 record winning the Western League, a Division II CIF Championship, and the State Championship, defeating St. Francis of Mountain View 74–59. The Hornets were led by UCLA standout Norman Powell and Victor Dean Jr., who both scored 24 points in the game. Dean was MVP for the game.

2010-11 basketball season
Coming off of a state championship, the Hornets were ranked #1 in San Diego, #7 in California and #10 in the Western Region. By February, the Hornets achieved a #1 ranking in the state and #7 in the nation, according to ESPN and USA Today. Lincoln was the first San Diego High School basketball team to be #1 ranked in California. The Hornets went on to a 31–2 record, repeating as champions in the Western League and CIF Division II. Lincoln advanced to the state southern regional before falling to Summit High School by four points.

2010-11 football season
In the regular season the Hornets posted a 4–6 record, which was good enough to land them a spot in the playoffs. Their first match-up was against Castle Park High School, who ended up losing 66–0. Lincoln played Ramona High School in the quarter-finals and won 41–28. As they met up with St. Augustine High School in the semi-finals, the Hornets had barely won 29–26. In the championship game against Cathedral Catholic High School, the Hornets lost 24–7. Making it to the championship was a big milestone for a program only four years old. The Hornets' Head Football Coach, Ron Hamamoto, was transferred the next season to Monte Vista High School, which was in the same Division in CIF as Lincoln. Former NFL player David Dunn took over.

2012-13 football season
The Hornets posted a 7–3 record in the regular season, making it Lincoln's best record since they re-opened in 2007. Their 7–3 record was good enough to land them the 4th seed spot in the CIF playoffs. After their bye week they faced Point Loma, who they beat 21–17. In the semi-finals they played undefeated Olympian. The Hornets won 20-7 and went on to play Ramona in the CIF Division III Championship. The Hornets won 42-14 and took their first championship title since the school re-opened, and its first championship title since 1987.

2022-23 Men’s Football State Champions

Notable people 
 Damon Allen, quarterback, Canadian Football League all-time leading passer from 2006 to 2011
 Marcus Allen, running back, member of College and Pro Football Hall of Fame, Super Bowl champion and MVP, Class of 1978
 Lew Barnes, football player
 Ronnie Yell, Football player Arizona Cardinals / Cornerback, Toronto Argonauts/ Defensive back,  BC Lions / Defensive back
 Kern Carson, former halfback of the San Diego Chargers, New York Jets, and the Toronto Argonauts
 Terrell Davis, running back, member of Pro Football Hall of Fame, 2-time Super Bowl champion, Class of 1990
 Dave Grayson, AFL all-time interceptions leader
 David Grayson, NFL player, Class of 1992
 Jimmy Gunn, professional football player
 Wally Henry, football player
 Dave Lewis, football player
 Saladin Martin, football player
 Dominic McGuire, basketball player
 Bob Mendoza, baseball player, San Diego Hall of Champions inductee, played football and baseball at Lincoln, Class of 1956
 Keith Miller, former outfielder for the Atlanta Braves and cousin of MLB All-Star Kevin Mitchell
 Norman Powell, basketball player for UCLA and for NBA's Los Angeles Clippers, second-round draft pick for Milwaukee Bucks, Class of 2011, 2019 NBA Champion 
 Doug Reed, football player
 Tyree Robinson, football player
 Patrick Rowe, football player
 Mark Sanford, basketball player for University of Washington, second-round pick in 1997 NBA Draft, Class of 1994
 Akili Smith, pro football quarterback, third overall selection of 1999 NFL Draft
 Steve Taylor, football player, Canadian Football League, 1989 to 1997
 Robert West, football player
 Edward James William Jr, electrical engineer, Class of 1995, served as National Executive Officer in the National Society of Black Engineers (NSBE)
 Dwayne Wright, football player

References

External links
 2009 Education not Arms No Weapons Training Victory
 1969 Lincoln Walkout Delivers First Black SD Principal Victory
 Lincoln High School website
 Artist's rendition of rebuilt Lincoln High School
 San Diego Union-Tribune special feature on Lincoln High School

Educational institutions established in 1955
High schools in San Diego
Public high schools in California
1955 establishments in California